Assat is a commune in the Pyrénées-Atlantiques department in southwestern France. It is located at the foot of the Pyrenees. Assat station has rail connections to Tarbes, Pau, Bordeaux and Bayonne. This little bastide was built at the end of the 12th century. Gaston Fébus lived there.

See also
Communes of the Pyrénées-Atlantiques department

References

Communes of Pyrénées-Atlantiques